PDE may refer to:

PDE, as initial letters of words:
Partial differential equation, differential equation involving partial derivatives (of a function of multiple variables)
 The European Democratic Party (esp. in Spanish, French or Italian languages)
 Present Day English
 Principle of double effect
 Program development environment
 Pug dog encephalitis
Pulse detonation engine, proposed substitute to the traditional jet engine 
Punta del Este 
 Other modes of abbreviation:
 Phosphodiesterase, enzyme important in intracellular communication
 Polydichloric euthimal, fictional substance 
 Pde (or Pde.), "Parade" (when serving as part of the proper name of a street or other way)